HMS Emphatic (W 154) was a  of the Royal Navy during World War II. Emphatic was built in the United States and transferred to the Royal Navy under Lend-Lease. She participated in the Normandy landings and was returned to the United States Navy postwar. She was transferred to the Philippine Navy in 1948 and received the name Ifugao. She was deleted in 1979.

Service history 
Emphatic was laid down in 1943 by the Levingston Shipbuilding Company in Orange, Texas, as ATR-96, launched 18 August 1943 and commissioned into the Royal Navy under Lend-Lease on 27 January 1944 as HMS Emphatic (W 154). She served through the war with the Royal Navy. During the Normandy landings, she towed Mulberry harbour pontoons.

The ship was returned to the United States Navy in 1946. She was transferred to the Philippine Navy in July 1948 and renamed BRP Ifugao (AQ-44). The tug was deleted in 1979.

References 

1943 ships
Favourite-class tugboats
Ships built in Orange, Texas
Ships transferred from the United States Navy to the Philippine Navy